Kim Lip is the sixth single album from South Korean girl group Loona's pre-debut project. It was released digitally on May 23 and physically on May 26, 2017, by Blockberry Creative and distributed by CJ E&M. It introduces member Kim Lip and contains two solo tracks, "Eclipse" and "Twilight".

Promotion and release 
In a post to the group's official Facebook account on May 17, 2017, Kim Lip's single album was described as "a glance at a new side of the Loonaverse," citing a new style of production from the other members' prior releases.  The single albums were released monthly by each Loona member under the series name Girl of the Month

Track listing

Charts

References

2017 singles
Loona (group) albums
Single albums
Blockberry Creative singles